Two Sisters was possibly built in the United States, or taken in 1798 as a prize of unknown origin. She became a slave ship sailing out of Liverpool, making two complete voyages as slaver. She was condemned at Kingston in 1802 after she had delivered her slaves on her third slave voyage.

Career
Two Sisters first appeared in Lloyd's Register (LR) in 1799. 

1st slave trading voyage (1799–1800): Captain John Sinclair sailed from Liverpool on 26 December 1799, bound for the Windward Coast. Two Sisters acquired slaves between Rio Nuñez and the Assini River. She arrived at St Vincent on 14 June 1800 with 161 slaves. She sailed for Liverpool on 3 July and arrived back at Liverpool on 6 September. She had left Liverpool with eight crew members and suffered one crew deaths on her voyage.

2nd slave trading voyage (1800–1801): Captain Sinclair sailed from Liverpool on 19 November 1800, bound for the Windward Coast. Two Sisters sailed from the Nuñez–Assini region on 7 February 1801 and arrived in Demerara on 12 March with 165 slaves. She sailed for Liverpool on 12 March and arrived there on 4 July. She had left Liverpool with 18 crew members and she suffered 13 crew deaths on her voyage. When she arrived at Liverpool her cargo consisted of 50 hogsheads of sugar, 80 bales of cotton, 150 elephants teeth (ivory tusks), 400 pounds of bees wax, and two mahogany logs.

3rd slave trading voyage (1801–Loss): Captain Sinclair sailed from Liverpool on 10 August 1801, bound for the Windward Coast. She acquired her slaves in the Nuñez–Assini region and arrived at Demerara on 15 January 1802 with 160 tons. She had left Liverpool with 22 crew members and suffered seven crew death on her voyage.

Loss
Two Sisters was condemned at Demerara after she had disembarked her slaves.

Citation

1790s ships
Liverpool slave ships